John Vogel may refer to:
John Vogel, head storywriter for the Mortal Kombat series
John W. Vogel, manager and owner of African-American minstrel companies in the United States